Sar Asiab or Sarasiab or Sar Asyab or Sarasiyab or Sar Asiyab Sar-e Asiab or Sar-i-Asiab or Sar Aseyab may refer to:

Fars Province
Sar Asiab-e Bala, Fars, a village in Mamasani County
Sar Asiab-e Pain, Fars, a village in Mamasani County

Isfahan Province
 Sar Asiab, Isfahan, a village in Natanz County

Kerman Province
 Sar Asiab, Jiroft, Kerman Province
 Sar Asiyab, Shahr-e Babak, Kerman Province
 Sar Asiab, Pa Qaleh, Shahr-e Babak County, Kerman Province
 Sar Asiab-e Bala, Kerman
 Sar Asiab-e Shesh, Kerman Province
 Sar Asiab-e Farsangi Rural District, in Kerman Province

Kermanshah Province
 Sar Asiab, Dalahu, Kermanshah Province
 Sar Asiab, Harsin, Kermanshah Province
 Sarasiab, Kermanshah, Kermanshah Province
 Sar Asiab, Sahneh, Kermanshah Province

Khuzestan Province
 Sarasiyab, Khuzestan

Kohgiluyeh and Boyer-Ahmad Province
 Sar Asiab-e Yusefi, a village in Bahmai County
 Sar Asiab-e Yusefi Rural District, in Bahmai County
 Sar Asiab-e Karreh, a village in Dana County
 Sar Asiab-e Ajam, a village in Kohgiluyeh County
 Sar Asiab-e Landeh, a village in Landeh County

Markazi Province

Razavi Khorasan Province
 Sar Asiab, Chenaran, Razavi Khorasan Province
 Sar Asiab, Gonabad, Razavi Khorasan Province
 Sar Asiab, Rashtkhvar, Razavi Khorasan Province
 Sar Asiab, Torqabeh and Shandiz, Razavi Khorasan Province
 Sar Asiab-e Bala, Razavi Khorasan

Semnan Province

South Khorasan Province
 Sar Asiab, South Khorasan
 Sar Asiab-e Mirza, South Khorasan Province

Other
 Sar Asiab-e Bala (disambiguation)
 Sar Asiab-e Farsangi (disambiguation)
 Sar Asiab-e Pain (disambiguation)